The Macmillan Brown Library (also known by its Māori name Te Puna Rakahau o Macmillan Brown) is a research library, archive, and art collection based in the New Zealand city of Christchurch. It is a library collection of national significance administrated by the University of Canterbury. The library is also a member of the Pacific Manuscripts Bureau.

Overview
The Macmillan Brown Library's collections consist mainly of items relating to the history of New Zealand and the Pacific Islands. It holds over 100,000 published items including books, audio-visual recordings, and various manuscripts, photographs, works of art, architectural drawings and ephemera. Some notable items in its collections include copies of Māori Land Court Records, official and government documents from various Pacific Islands states, trade union records, and the personal papers of various Members of Parliament and government ministers. Its art collection also has over 5,000 works, making one of the largest collections in the Canterbury region.

The Macmillan Brown Library was established in 1935 as a separate collection within the University of Canterbury Library. It was created through the philanthropy of Professor John Macmillan Brown, who was one of the first academics at the newly established Canterbury College in 1874, one of the constituent colleges of the University of New Zealand, which later became the University of Canterbury. He allocated a large proportion of his fortune to the Macmillan Brown Library.

The library is located within the university's Ilam campus on the second floor of the Te Ao Tūroa building.

External links
Macmillan Brown Library website
The Library document

Research libraries
Libraries in Christchurch
University of Canterbury
History of Christchurch
Archives in New Zealand
Tourist attractions in Christchurch